Uwe Flade is a German music video director and entrepreneur. He has directed videos for many artists, such as a-ha, Depeche Mode, Franz Ferdinand, Apocalyptica, Westbam, Volbeat, In Extremo, Nickelback and Rammstein. His shortfilm Das Spray was acquired by ARTE TV in 2022. He also created successful apps for kids like nighty night and little box music box with Egmont Mayer, Heidi Wittlinger and Grit Schuster. In 2014 He was part of Berlin Music Video Awards Jury.

He lives in Berlin, Germany.

Videography
Music videos:

Music documentaries:

Commercials (excerpt):

References

External links
http://www.uweflade.de/
Filmography

Wikinews interview
www.filmdatabox.com

German music video directors
Living people
Year of birth missing (living people)